The 2016–17 season was Football Club Internazionale Milano's 108th in existence and 101st consecutive season in the top flight of Italian football. The team competed in Serie A, in the Coppa Italia, and in the UEFA Europa League.

Kit
Supplier: Nike / Sponsor: Pirelli

Season overview
During the summer of UEFA Euro 2016, a Chinese company, Suning Holdings Group, bought almost all the shares of club. Roberto Mancini left the side days before the season started, with Frank de Boer called to replace him: when he was appointed, the Dutch manager barely knew Italian. This season resulted, once again, in disappointment for supporters; De Boer started with poor results against low-ranked opponents, such as Chievo and Palermo, deteriorating the opinion of his fans. In these, and other matches, Inter had a shortness of goals with the result that their wins were, often, due to the performances of individual players (mainly the captain Icardi and Perišić).

The European campaign proved to be poor, with a group phase opened with two losses. De Boer took the blame for Inter's defeats, being fired after the 1–0 loss to Sampdoria. His successor, Stefano Pioli, could not avoid failure in the Europa League: Inter recorded the worst group result of its history in UEFA competitions, with only six points gained. Pioli then collected a streak of eight consecutive wins, seven of which were in Serie A. However, not even the notable number of players bought (Candreva, Banega, João Mário, Barbosa, Ansaldi in the summer, plus Sainsbury and Gagliardini in January) and the young (Bakayoko, Pinamonti, Gnoukouri, Miangue, Yao and Radu) helped the side to recover enough points to enter the top three. As the result, Inter missed the European qualification for the 2017–18 season.

Players

Squad information
.

Note: Some players were registered for the domestic competitions only (João Mário, Kondogbia, Jovetić and Gabriel), and vice versa for Berni, who was registered to 2016–17 UEFA Europa League only (Lega Serie A allowed clubs to replace one goalkeeper by another goalkeeper on the list). Both UEFA and Lega Serie A imposed a cap on the first team squad, originally both were capped at 25 players with additional requirements on homegrown players (marked as HG) and club-trained players (marked as CT), with exclusion for club-trained under-21 players (UEFA and Lega Serie A defined U21 players differently; marked as List B and U21 respectively). However, due to Internazionale had a net loss that over the threshold of UEFA Financial Fair Play Regulations, Inter was limited to 22 players in the UEFA competitions plus unlimited club-trained under-21 players in the List B, as well as restriction to register some expensive signings.

Transfers

In

Out

Pre-season and friendlies

Riscone di Brunico training camp

International Champions Cup

Other friendlies

Trofeo Casino Marbella

Competitions

Overall

Serie A

League table

Results summary

Results by round

Matches

Coppa Italia

UEFA Europa League

Group stage

Statistics

Appearances and goals

|-
! colspan=14 style="background:#dcdcdc; text-align:center| Goalkeepers

|-
! colspan=14 style="background:#dcdcdc; text-align:center| Defenders

|-
! colspan=14 style="background:#dcdcdc; text-align:center| Midfielders

|-
! colspan=14 style="background:#dcdcdc; text-align:center| Forwards

|-
! colspan=14 style="background:#dcdcdc; text-align:center| Players transferred out during the season

Goalscorers

Last updated: 28 May 2017

Clean sheets

Last updated: 28 May 2017

Disciplinary record

Last updated: 28 May 2017

References

Inter Milan seasons
Internazionale
Internazionale